Cape Town, South Africa, has had two tramway networks forming part of its public transport arrangements.  Both networks are now long closed.

History
In around 1896, it was converted to electrical operation. From , it was gradually replaced by trolleybuses, which were always referred to by English-speaking locals as "Trackless trams".

It was powered by electricity, and was in operation until .

See also

History of Cape Town
List of town tramway systems in Africa
Rail transport in South Africa
Transport in Cape Town
Trolleybuses in Cape Town

References

Notes

Further reading

External links

Camps Bay Tramways – a description of the line from Cape Town to Camps Bay and Sea Point

Passenger rail transport in South Africa
Tram transport in South Africa
Transport in Cape Town
Cape Town